Starlights GAA is a Gaelic Athletic Association club in based in the Collinstown area in Fingal, within the traditional County Dublin.

The club has an adult men's football team which in 2016 played in the Dublin AFL Division 9 and won the Dublin Junior "E" Football Championship along with the Sheridan cup.

Honours
 Junior E Football Championship Winners 2016
 Sheridan Cup Winners 2016

References

External links
Dublin Club GAA
Dublin GAA
Official Starlights Website

Gaelic games clubs in Fingal
Gaelic football clubs in Fingal